Rubiadin is a bioactive anthraquinone isolated from Morinda citrifolia.

References

Dihydroxyanthraquinones
Resorcinols